Corydalis cheilanthifolia, the fern-leaved corydalis or fern-leaf corydalis, is a perennial growing from rhizomes, native to western and central China.

Description
Leaves are shaped like lipfern (Cheilanthes), for which the plant is named. They turn bronze and remain over winter.

Flowers are yellow and bloom in long upright racemes on leafless stems from mid-spring to early summer.

Seeds with elaiosomes are borne in a long, thin pod.

Gallery

References

External links

cheilanthifolia
Plants described in 1892